Kevin Rankin (born April 18, 1976) is an American actor. He is known for his roles as Herc in the NBC series Friday Night Lights, Tyler Briggs in the NBC series Trauma, Roe Sanders in the CBS series Unforgettable, Kenny in the AMC series Breaking Bad, and Derek "Devil" Lennox in the FX TV series Justified.

Early life and career
Rankin was born in Baton Rouge, Louisiana in 1976. Up to age eleven, he also grew up there with his parents and three older sisters. The family then moved to Houston, Texas, where Rankin finished high school.

After watching the television show The Fall Guy, Rankin originally intended on becoming a stunt man, until he realized the main character, a stunt man, was, in fact, played by an actor, Lee Majors. 

Rankin began his acting career with an appearance on the television show Unsolved Mysteries. He began his acting career in 1997 with a small role in the drama film The Apostle. Starting in 2000, roles in various television series followed, notably Buffy the Vampire Slayer, NYPD Blue and Philly. In 2002, he starred as "Doc" in eleven episodes of the series My Guide to Becoming a Rock Star. He also had other, longer-running appearances in Undeclared, Six Feet Under, State of Mind, Bionic Woman, and Friday Night Lights. 

In 2009, he landed the role of "Tyler Briggs" in the NBC series Trauma; the series was canceled after the first season. In 2011, he guest-starred in five episodes of the HBO drama Big Love. He played a main role in the criminal series Unforgettable from 2011-12. After a restructuring of the show, his character was dropped in the second season. Since 2017, he has played Bryce Hussar in TNT's drama Claws.

Personal life
In 2000, Rankin moved to Los Angeles, where he met Jill Farley. At the shooting of the pilot episode of Trauma, he proposed to her. They married on October 23, 2010, and have a son and daughter together.

Filmography

Film

Television

References

External links 

1976 births
20th-century American male actors
21st-century American male actors
American male film actors
American male television actors
Living people
Male actors from Baton Rouge, Louisiana